This is a list of notable events in Latin music (i.e. Spanish- and Portuguese-speaking music from Latin America, Europe, and the United States) that took place in 2015.

Events
May 7 – Argentine singer-songwriter Teresa Parodi is appointed her country's first Minister of Culture following the president's decision to promote the Culture Secretariat to a cabinet-level ministry.
July 30Telemundo announces that it has acquired the rights to produce a Spanish-language version of the American Music Awards from the Dick Clark Productions. The inaugural awards show is planned to air in fall 2015.
October 29 — "Bailando" by Enrique Iglesias, Gente de Zona, and Descemer Bueno breaks the record for the longest-running song at number-one on the Billboard Hot Latin Songs chart, surpassing "La Tortura" by Shakira and Alejandro Sanz.
November 19 — Joan Manuel Serrat is honored by the Latin Academy of Recording Arts & Sciences as the Person of the Year.
November 20
14th Annual Latin Grammy Awards
"Bailando" by Enrique Iglesias, Gente de Zona, and Descemer Bueno wins Song of the Year. 
"Universos Paralelos" by Jorge Drexler and Ana Tijoux wins Record of the Year.
Paco de Lucía posthumously wins Album of the Year for  Canción Andaluza.
Mariana Vega wins Best New Artist.

Number-ones albums and singles by country
List of Hot 100 number-one singles of 2014 (Brazil)
List of number-one songs of 2014 (Colombia)
List of number-one albums of 2014 (Mexico)
List of number-one albums of 2014 (Portugal)
List of number-one albums of 2014 (Spain)
List of number-one singles of 2014 (Spain)
List of number-one Billboard Latin Albums from the 2010s
List of number-one Billboard Hot Latin Songs of 2014
List of number-one singles of 2014 (Venezuela)

Awards
2014 Premio Lo Nuestro
2014 Billboard Latin Music Awards
2014 Latin Grammy Awards
2014 Tejano Music Awards

Albums released

First-quarter

January

February

March

Second-quarter

April

May

June

Third-quarter

July

August

September

Fourth-quarter

October

November

December

Best-selling records

Best-selling albums
The following is a list of the top 10 best-selling Latin albums in the United States in 2014, according to Billboard.

Best-performing songs
The following is a list of the top 10 best-performing Latin songs in the United States in 2014, according to Billboard.

Deaths
January 6 — Nelson Ned, 66, Brazilian singer, pneumonia.
January 21 — Tony Pabón, 74, American singer, trumpeter and bandleader.
January 26 — Juanita Garica, 84, tejano music hall of fame inductee, natural causes.
February 12 — Santiago Feliú, 51, Cuban singer-songwriter, heart attack.
February 19 — Simón Díaz, 85, Venezuelan singer and composer.
February 25 — Paco de Lucía, 66, Spanish flamenco guitarist, heart attack.
March 14 – Paulo Schroeber, 40, Brazilian guitarist (post-surgery complications)
April 5 — Óscar Avilés, 90, Peruvian guitarist and singer.
April 17 — Cheo Feliciano, 78, American Puerto Rican salsa and bolero composer and singer, traffic collision.
April 19 — Sonia Silvestre, 61, Dominican singer and announcer, stroke.
April 23 — Benjamín Brea, 67, Spanish-born Venezuelan musician, stomach cancer.
May 1 — Juan Formell, 71, Cuban Grammy Award-winning musician, composer and director (Los Van Van).
May 8 — Jair Rodrigues, 75, Brazilian musician and singer, heart attack.
May 23 — Uña Ramos, 80, Argentine musician.
May 29 — Tito Torbellino, 31, American banda singer and musician, shot.
June 3 — Virginia Luque, 86, Argentine singer and actress.
June 7 — Helcio Milito, 83, Brazilian musician.
July 14 — Vange Leonel, 51, Brazilian singer, writer, feminist and LGBT activist, ovarian cancer.
August 3 — Daladier Arismendi, 39, Colombian singer, stabbed.
August 4 — Rafael Santa Cruz, 53, Peruvian cajon musician and actor, heart attack.
August 7 — Peret, 79, Spanish singer, guitarist and composer, lung cancer.
September 4 — Gustavo Cerati, 55, Argentine singer and musician (Soda Stereo), respiratory arrest.
September 19 — Milton Cardona, 69, Puerto Rican jazz musician, heart failure.
September 30 — Jadir Ambrósio, 91, Brazilian musician and composer.
October 3 — Nati Cano, 81, Mexican-born American mariachi musician (Mariachi los Camperos), recipient of the National Heritage Fellowship (1990).
December 21 — Horacio Ferrer, 81, Uruguayan/Argentine poet and tango lyricist.
December 28 — Leopoldo Federico, 87, Argentine tango musician.

References

 
Latin music by year